Antelope Creek may refer to:

Arizona
 Antelope Creek (Coconino County); see Antelope Canyon

California
 Antelope Creek (Placer County)
 Antelope Creek (Plumas County, California) (Plumas County)
 Antelope Creek (Tehama County)

Oregon
 Antelope Creek (Little Butte Creek)

South Dakota
 Antelope Creek (Butte County, South Dakota)
 Antelope Creek (Day County, South Dakota)
 Antelope Creek (Harding County, South Dakota)
 Antelope Creek (Missouri River), a stream in South Dakota
 Antelope Creek (Todd County, South Dakota)

See also 
 Antelope Creek Bridge
 Antelope Creek Phase